Evrard d'Orleans (1292–1357) was a French gothic sculptor, painter, and architect.

D'Orleans worked for the French Royal Court, producing a number of paintings and sculptures. He also worked on the Langres Cathedral, to repair and add pieces to it after a fire. 
One of his works for the Cathedral, An Angel Carrying Two Cruets, currently resides at the Louvre.

References

1292 births
1357 deaths